Ontario is Canada's largest province in population and second largest province in size, covering close to one million square kilometres. It borders the United States to the south, and the provinces of Quebec to the east and Manitoba to the west. Its southernmost point, Middle Island, off Pelee Island, has the same latitude as Rome, Italy. The northernmost point at Ontario-Manitoba border is close to that of London, England, and Warsaw, Poland. Around 250,000 lakes can be found in Ontario, making up approximately one-third of the world's fresh water.

Ontario’s travel experiences
Theme parks include Canada's Wonderland,  Wildwater Kingdom, the Toronto Zoo and Centreville Amusement Park.

The Royal Ontario Museum, the Art Gallery of Ontario, the Canadian Museum of Nature, the Ontario Science Centre and Science North all offer kid-specific programs.
Historical sites include such as Casa Loma or Fort William Historical Park.

North America's oldest public aviary is located in Hamilton, Ontario. The Hamilton Aviary opened on June 1, 1928 at Dundurn Castle. 

The numerous Ontario's Provincial Parks, Canadian National Parks and Conservation Areas offer camping, swimming, hiking, paddling and sightseeing.
With more fresh water lakes than anywhere else in the world, beaches include such as Wasaga Beach, Sauble Beach and Sandbanks Provincial Park.

Fishing in Ontario
Ontario's lakes, rivers and waterways offer fishing ranging from remote fly-in outposts to relaxed family housekeeping resorts, from ice-fishing to summer charter trips.

Hunting in Ontario
Ontario has a long tradition of outdoor sport and hunting is a large part of it. Species available for hunting include black bear, moose, white-tailed deer, grouse, wild turkey and waterfowl.

Weather in Ontario
Due to Ontario's size, temperatures may vary tremendously from region to region and even within the regions themselves. Generally, the weather is considered continental, with temperatures ranging from humid in the south, with chilly winters and warm summers, to sub-Arctic in the north. January is traditionally the coldest month of the year and July is the warmest.

Regions of Ontario
Northern Ontario
From iconic Georgian Bay across to the great Algonquin Provincial Park, Ontario also extends north all the way up to the Hudson Bay. Some of the larger cities of Northern Ontario include Thunder Bay, Sault Ste. Marie, Greater Sudbury and the City of North Bay.

Eastern Ontario
This region extends along the historic St. Lawrence Seaway towards the Ottawa Valley and up towards Algonquin Park, bordering with Quebec. Communities in this region include Prince Edward County, Kingston, Cornwall and Renfrew.

Greater Toronto Area
The GTA, Canada's largest urban centre, is the band of cities, towns and countryside that surround the city of Toronto.

Ottawa Region
Ottawa is Canada's capital, and this historic region is located in Eastern Ontario.

Southwestern Ontario
Southwestern Ontario extends from Pelee Island, the southernmost point of mainland Canada, up to the tip of the Bruce Peninsula on the Georgian Bay.
Windsor, London, Sarnia, Kitchener-Waterloo and Owen Sound are all located in Southwestern Ontario.

Central Ontario
Rich in forest, lakes and rivers and sandy beaches, Central Ontario is popular for outdoor fun and relaxation. Popular destinations in Central Ontario include Muskoka, Huntsville, Haliburton, Kawarthas and the Georgian Bay area.

Niagara Peninsula
The Niagara Region borders the U.S. to the south, and is a popular travel destination.

Major cities
Ottawa
Ottawa is the capital city of Canada, with stately architecture, including Parliament Hill. Ottawa is also known for its green spaces and its waterways - the Ottawa River, the Rideau River and the Rideau Canal, recently named a UNESCO World Heritage Site. Culturally Ottawa offers many national galleries and museums such as the National Gallery of Canada, the National Arts Centre and the Canadian Museum of Civilization.

Toronto
Toronto, Ontario, Canada's largest and most diverse urban centre, is a busy, bustling city. The CN Tower may be an attraction of the city, however Toronto is a major scene for theatre and performing arts, as well as galleries, zoos, museums and internationally recognized events such as Caribana, the Toronto International Film Festival, and Pride Week. Toronto will host the International Indian Film Academy Awards in June, 2011. Toronto is also a popular destination for sport fans with professional baseball, hockey, basketball, football, lacrosse and soccer teams playing throughout the year.

Niagara Falls
Niagara Falls is the city located beside the world-famous
waterfalls by the same name, and much of the cities’ tourism is dominated by this spectacular natural wonder. For example, attractions like the Maid of the Mist, the Journey Behind the Falls and the Illumination of the Falls all showcase the Falls and add excitement to the area. However, there is much more to this city, such as two dazzling casinos, numerous parks and gardens, a burgeoning wine and culinary culture, as well as loads of family-oriented attractions like wax museums, theme parks and indoor waterparks.

Travelling to Ontario 
There are a variety of transportation systems available for travelling to and around Ontario. This includes domestic and international airlines, car rental companies, public transportation, trains and ferries.

Destination Ontario
The Destination Ontario, formerly Ontario Tourism Marketing Partnership Corporation (OTMPC), is a government agency created in 1999 to partner with Ontario tourism operators to showcase Ontario as a four-season must-see travel destination both domestically and internationally.
Recent marketing campaigns include the ‘There’s No Place Like This’ song performed by local artists Molly Johnson, Brian Byrne, Keshia Chante, Tomi Swick, Alex J. Robinson, Toya Alexis, Justin Hines, the Arkells and the Aline Morales Band.

See also 

 Destination Ontario

References

External links

  
 Yours to Discover: Tourism in Ontario Through Time, online exhibit on Archives of Ontario website